Manzi may refer to:

People
Alberto Manzi (1924–1997), Italian school teacher, writer and television host
Catello Manzi (1950), American harness racing driver and trainer
Elios Manzi (born 1996), Italian judoka
Franco Manzi (born 1966), Italian Catholic priest and academic
Homero Manzi (1907–1951), Argentine tango writer, author of various famous tangos
Jim Manzi (born 1951), former chairman, president and CEO of Lotus Development Corporation
Jim Manzi (software entrepreneur) (born 1963), National Review contributing editor and software company chairman
Leonardo Manzi (born 1969), Brazilian football coach and a former player
Roberto Manzi (born 1959), Italian fencer
Stefano Manzi (1999), Italian motorcycle racer
Warren Manzi (1955–2016), American playwright and actor

Places
Manzi (蠻子), a disparaging term for Southern China

See also
Mangi (disambiguation)
Manji (disambiguation)
Mansi (disambiguation)
Andrew Manze (born 1965), United Kingdom baroque violinist
Louis Manzo (born 1955), United States politician from New Jersey, who served in the General Assembly from 2004 to 2008
Paul Manz (1919–2009), American composer for choir and organ
Felix Manz (c. 1498–1527), co-founder of the original Swiss Brethren Anabaptist congregation in Zürich, Switzerland, and the first martyr of the Radical Reformation
Menzies, a Scottish surname, originally the name of the Clan Menzies
Manzini, Eswatini, a town in the Manzini District, Eswatini